The 2021–22 Scottish Cup was the 137th season of Scotland's most prestigious football knockout competition.

The defending champions St Johnstone, who won the 2021 Scottish Cup Final on 22 May 2021, were defeated by Kelty Hearts in the fourth round.

Calendar
The calendar for the 2021–22 Scottish Cup was announced by Scottish Football Association on 30 July 2021.

The format featured several changes from the previous season, with all Highland and Lowland League teams entering in the same round. Replays were re-introduced for drawn matches played before the fourth round after they were removed for the 2020–21 competition. However, replays that were level after 90 minutes went directly to a penalty shootout instead of playing extra time.

Preliminary round
The preliminary round took place on 28 August 2021.

Cumnock Juniors, Dalkeith Thistle, Darvel, Dunbar United, and Sauchie Juniors took part in the Scottish Cup for the first time having each gained their Club Licence. Auchinleck Talbot, Irvine Meadow, Musselburgh Athletic  also competed for the first time as SFA members rather than qualifiers. Clydebank made their first appearance in the Scottish Cup since 2001–02 after re-founding as a junior club in 2003 and gaining their SFA licence.

Draw
Teams in bold advanced to the first round.

The draw for the preliminary round took place on 12 August 2021. Auchinleck Talbot, Camelon Juniors, Clydebank, Cumnock Juniors, Darvel, Dunipace, Glasgow University, Haddington Athletic, Hill of Beath Hawthorn, Lothian Thistle Hutchison Vale, Newtongrange Star, Sauchie, St Cuthbert Wanderers, Tranent Juniors and Wigtown & Bladnoch all received a bye to the first round.

Matches

Replay

First round
The first round took place on the weekend of 18 September 2021. Along with the 11 winners from the preliminary round and 15 teams with byes, there were 34 new entries at this stage - 18 from the Highland Football League and 16 from the Lowland Football League. The draw took place on 29 August 2021.

Draw
Teams in bold advanced to the second round.

Matches

Replays

Second round
The second round took place on the weekend of 23 October 2021. Along with the 30 winners from the first round, there were 10 new entries at this stage - all from League Two. The draw took place on 19 September 2021.

Draw
Teams in Italics were unknown at the time of the draw. Teams in bold advanced to the third round.

Matches

Replays

Third round
The third round took place on the weekend of 27 November 2021. Along with the 20 winners from the second round, there were 20 new entries at this stage - from League One and the Championship. The draw took place on 24 October 2021 at 5:15pm live on the Scottish Cup YouTube, Facebook and Twitter pages.

Draw
Teams in Italics were unknown at the time of the draw. Teams in bold advanced to the fourth round.

Matches

Replays

Fourth round
The fourth round took place on the weekend of 22 January 2022. Along with the 20 winners from the third round, there were 12 new entries at this stage - from the Premiership. The draw took place on 29 November 2021 following the Brechin City v Darvel match live on BBC Scotland.

Draw
Teams in Italics were unknown at the time of the draw. Teams in bold advanced to the fifth round. Auchinleck Talbot were drawn against Premiership club Heart of Midlothian (58 places above them), representing the biggest league position gap between two teams in the competition's history since the pyramid system was introduced.

Matches

Fifth round
The fifth round took place on the weekend of 12 February 2022, featuring the 16 winners from the fourth round. The draw took place on 22 January 2022 following the Alloa Athletic v Celtic match live on Premier Sports 1. Teams in bold advanced to the quarter-finals.

Draw

Matches

Quarter-finals
The quarter-finals took place on the weekend of 12 March 2022. The draw took place on 14 February 2022 following the Peterhead v Dundee match live on BBC Scotland with guest Paul Slane.

Draw
Teams in Bold advanced to the semi-finals.

Matches

Semi-finals
The semi-finals took place on the weekend of 16 April 2022. The draw took place on 14 March 2022 following the Dundee United v Celtic match live on Premier Sports 1 with guest Greg Hemphill.

The semi-finalists were Celtic, Hearts, Hibernian and Rangers, the first time in the competition's history (its 122nd edition since Celtic were founded in 1888) that this combination of teams made up the last four.

Draw

Matches

Final

Broadcasting
The Scottish Cup was broadcast by Premier Sports and BBC Scotland. Premier Sports had the first two picks of the fourth and fifth rounds, the quarter-finals as well as first pick of one semi-final and  aired the final non-exclusively. BBC Scotland broadcast one match per round from the first round onwards and two matches per round from the fourth round to the quarter-finals, as well as one semi-final and the final.

The following matches were be broadcast live on UK television:

References

2021–22 in Scottish football cups
2021-22
2021–22 European domestic association football cups